Ptilocnemus femoralis is a species of feather-legged bugs in the Holoptilinae subfamily. This species is found in Australia and has a specialized gland called a trichome that produces a chemical to attract and paralyze ants.

References

Reduviidae
Insects described in 1902
Hemiptera of Australia